Akiyo Noguchi first competed in the Climbing World Cup in 2005 in lead discipline that took place in Shanghai, China.
In 2007, she started competing in bouldering and won her first World Cup medal (silver) in Sofia, Bulgaria. 
In 2008, she won her first gold medal in Bouldering World Cup in Montauban, France.
Over the years, she has competed in both lead and boulder, with more success in the latter.
Noguchi attended her final IFSC Climbing World Cup in Innsbruck in June 2021, finishing a career of 149 World Cups and 68 podium places.

References 

IFSC Climbing World Cup